The Casper Motor Company-Natrona Motor Company is a historic building in Casper, Wyoming which was listed on the National Register of Historic Places in 1994.  It eventually became the Iris Theater and then later, and currently as of 2018, The Lyric, an event venue.

It was built in 1918 in Mission Revival/Spanish Colonial Revival style, and is located at 230 West Yellowstone Highway.

It was built "by Albert Majors and Benjamin Mueller to house the Casper Auto Company, an auto showroom and garage run by B.B. Lummis."

It is a  two-story brick building.

References

External links
The Lyric - Casper

Theatres in Wyoming
National Register of Historic Places in Natrona County, Wyoming
Mission Revival architecture in Wyoming
Event venues established in 1918